Gustav Pfizer (1807–1890) was a German poet and critic of the Swabian school.

Biography
He was born in Stuttgart, studied at Tübingen, and in 1840 became professor at the gymnasium in Stuttgart. He wrote Gedichte (1831), Dichtungen epischer und episch-lyrischer Gattung (1840), and Der Welsche und der Deutsche (1844); translations of Bulwer and Byron; the critical work Uhland und Rückert (1837); and an attack on Heinrich Heine, which Heine replied to in his work Der Schwabenspiegel (“The Swabian mirror,” 1838). Pfizer's poetry has been said to be more original and reflective than most of the products of the Swabian school.

Notes

References
 

1807 births
1890 deaths
German poets
German literary critics
Writers from Stuttgart
German male poets
19th-century poets
19th-century German writers
19th-century German male writers
German male non-fiction writers